The Jenkins–DuBois Farm and Mill Site is located along Jenkinstown Road in Gardiner, Ulster County, New York, United States. It was started by settler Lambert Jenkins in 1793 with a stone house and mills on land part of the original Huguenot Patent owned by Louis DuBois of nearby New Paltz. The Jenkins–DuBois descendants still live on the land today.

It was added to the National Register of Historic Places in 2001.

References

Houses completed in 1793
Farms on the National Register of Historic Places in New York (state)
Gardiner, New York
National Register of Historic Places in Ulster County, New York